Rudauli railway station is a railway station in Faizabad district, Uttar Pradesh in Northern India. And it is well connected with Delhi, Kanpur, Lucknow, Varanasi. Rudauli is busiest station between Lucknow to Varanasi after Faizabad.

Services

The Indian Railways network connects Faizabad directly with Kanpur (3.5 hours) Lucknow (2 hours.), Varanasi (5 hours.) and Allahabad (6 hours). A few mail express trains also connect Rudauli to Kolkata, and Ajmer.

There are intercity train between Faizabad and Lucknow via Rudauli.

See also
 Faizabad Delhi Express
 Saket Express
 Faizabad Superfast Express
 
 Lucknow Charbagh railway station

References

Railway stations in Faizabad district
Lucknow NR railway division
Railway stations opened in 1874
Buildings and structures in Faizabad